Ensemble Scolaire Jean-Baptiste de La Salle - Notre-Dame de la Compassion is a private Catholic school in Saint-Denis, Seine-Saint-Denis, France, in the Paris metropolitan area. It serves primary school through sixth-form college/senior high school (lycée).

 about 2,400 students attend this school. The majority of the students were of recent immigrant origins.

References

External links
 Ensemble Scolaire Jean-Baptiste de La Salle - Notre-Dame de la Compassion 

Saint-Denis, Seine-Saint-Denis
Schools in Seine-Saint-Denis
Lycées in Seine-Saint-Denis
Catholic secondary schools in France
Catholic elementary and primary schools in France